East Kerema Rural LLG is a local-level government (LLG) of Gulf Province, Papua New Guinea.

Wards
01. Lelefiru
02. Kukipi
03. Uritai
04. Popo
05. Lese
06. Miaru
07. Iokea
08. Oiapu

References

Local-level governments of Gulf Province